Delaware County is a county located in the U.S. state of Iowa. As of the 2020 census, the population was 17,488. The county seat is Manchester. The county takes its name after the U.S. state of Delaware.

Geography

It has a rough hilly surface.

Major highways
 U.S. Highway 20
 Iowa Highway 3
 Iowa Highway 13
 Iowa Highway 38

Adjacent counties
Buchanan County  (west)
Clayton County  (north)
Dubuque County  (east)
Fayette County  (northwest)
Jones County  (southeast)
Linn County  (southwest)

Demographics

2020 census
There were 8,100 housing units of which 7,141 were occupied.

2010 census
There were 8,028 housing units, of which 7,062 were occupied.

2000 census

As of the census of 2000, there were 18,404 people, 6,834 households, and 5,029 families residing in the county. The population density was 32 people per square mile (12/km2). There were 7,682 housing units at an average density of 13 per square mile (5/km2). The racial makeup of the county was 99.28% White, 0.07% Black or African American, 0.10% Native American, 0.14% Asian, 0.01% Pacific Islander, 0.10% from other races, and 0.30% from two or more races. 0.66% of the population were Hispanic or Latino of any race.

There were 6,834 households, out of which 36.70% had children under the age of 18 living with them, 64.10% were married couples living together, 6.20% had a female householder with no husband present, and 26.40% were non-families. 23.00% of all households were made up of individuals, and 11.20% had someone living alone who was 65 years of age or older. The average household size was 2.66 and the average family size was 3.15.

In the county, the population was spread out, with 29.00% under the age of 18, 7.00% from 18 to 24, 27.60% from 25 to 44, 21.50% from 45 to 64, and 15.00% who were 65 years of age or older. The median age was 37 years. For every 100 females there were 98.40 males. For every 100 females age 18 and over, there were 96.60 males.

The median income for a household in the county was $37,168, and the median income for a family was $43,607. Males had a median income of $30,712 versus $19,685 for females. The per capita income for the county was $17,327. About 6.30% of families and 7.90% of the population were below the poverty line, including 8.50% of those under age 18 and 9.80% of those age 65 or over.

Communities

Cities

Colesburg
Delaware
Delhi
Dundee
Dyersville
Earlville
Edgewood
Greeley
Hopkinton
Manchester
Masonville
Ryan

Townships
Delaware County is divided into these townships:

 Adams
 Bremen
 Coffins Grove
 Colony
 Delaware
 Delhi
 Elk
 Hazel Green
 Honey Creek
 Milo
 Prairie
 Richland
 South Fork
 North Fork
 Oneida
 Union

Unincorporated Communities

Petersburg
Robinson
Rockville

Population ranking
The population ranking of the following table is based on the 2020 census of Delaware County.

† county seat

Politics

See also

National Register of Historic Places listings in Delaware County, Iowa

References

External links

County website

 
1837 establishments in Wisconsin Territory
Populated places established in 1837